Following is a list of Belgian architects in alphabetical order.

A–M

 Alphonse Balat (1818-1895)
 Jean-Baptiste de Béthune (1821-1894)
 Hendrik Beyaert (1823-1894)

 Francis Bonaert (1914-2012)
 Albert Bontridder (1921-2015)
 Victor Bourgeois (1897-1962)
 Renaat Braem (1910-2001)
 Cluysenaar family
 Jean-Pierre Cluysenaar (1811-1880)
 Christine Conix (born 1955)
 Xaveer De Geyter (born 1957)
 Louis Delacenserie (1838-1909)
 Luc Deleu (born 1944)
 Laurent-Benoît Dewez (1731-1812)
 Wim Goes
 Paul Hankar (1859-1901)
 Victor Horta (1861-1947)
 Jan Keldermans
 Lucien Kroll (born 1927)
 François Massau

N–Z

 Paul Neefs (1933-2009)
 Johan Neerman (born 1959)
 Philippe Neerman (1930-2011)
 Charles Nissens (1858-1919)
 Joseph Poelaert (1817-1879)
 Dita Roque-Gourary (1915-2010)
 Paul Saintenoy (1862-1952)
 Christian Satin (born 1946)
 Gustave Strauven (1878-1919)
 Claude Strebelle (1917-2010)
 Ferdinand Truyman (1857-1939)
 Alphonse Vanden Eynde (1884-1951)

 Henry Van de Velde (1863-1957)

 Henri van Dievoet (1869-1931)
 Frans Van Dijk (1853-1939)
 Bob Van Reeth (born 1943)
 Charles van Rysselberghe (1850-1920)
 Octave van Rysselberghe (1855-1929)
 Antoine Varlet (1893-1940)
 Jean-Jacques Winders (1849-1936)

See also

 List of architects
 List of Belgians

Belgian
Architects